The 1957-58 Oberliga season was the 10th season of the Oberliga, the top level of ice hockey in Germany. The Oberliga was replaced by the Ice hockey Bundesliga as the top-level league for 1958–59. The Oberliga became the second level of German ice hockey. 12 teams participated in the league, and EV Füssen won the championship. Preußen Krefeld won the DEV-Pokal.

First round

West Group

South Group

Final round

DEV-Pokal

References

Oberliga (ice hockey) seasons
West
Ger